Ianchuk or Yanchuk is a gender-neutral Ukrainian surname that may refer to
Dmytro Ianchuk (born 1992), Ukrainian sprint canoeist
Elizaveta Ianchuk (born 1993), Ukrainian tennis player
Olga Ianchuk (born 1995), Ukrainian tennis player, sister of Elizaveta
Pavlo Yanchuk (born 1986), Ukrainian football defender
Vadim Yanchuk (born 1982), Russian football player

See also
 
 

Ukrainian-language surnames